Get Away, Get Away is a 1992 Australian Road Comedy film which was the directorial debut of actor Murray Fahey.

Plot
Bank teller Rick Carter gets away for the weekend on the advice of used car salesman Andrew. He runs into a beautiful French hitchhiker, Suzanne, and some criminals, Carl the Mouth and Benny the Brain.

Cast
Murray Fahey as Rick Carter
Annie Davies as Suzette
Ewan Campbell as Carl the Mouth
Rodd Hibbard as Darren the Cafe
Ned Manning as Benny the Brain

Production
The film was shot in Sydney over two weeks on 16mm from January 1991 to August 1992.

Release
It was not released theatrically in Australia but did sell overseas.

References

External links

Get Away, Get Away at Screen Australia

Australian comedy films
1992 films
Films directed by Murray Fahey
1992 directorial debut films
1990s English-language films
Australian road movies
1990s Australian films